Sir Christopher Hughes Masterman  (7 October 1889 – 16 February 1982) was a British civil servant and bureaucrat who served as Chief Secretary of the Madras Presidency from 1943 to 1947.

Early life and education 

Born on 7 October 1889 to Captain John Masterman of the Royal Navy, Masterman was educated at Winchester College and Trinity College, Oxford. Masterman married Hope Gladys Gearing in Madras in 1921. They had two sons, John and David.

Career 

Masterman joined the Indian Civil Service in 1913 and served as Assistant Collector and Magistrate in the Madras Presidency. From 1917 to 1919, he was called for military service during the First World War and from 1924 to 1932, he was served as Collector of Salt Revenue. Apart from serving as District Collector of Madras (1932–35) and Vizagapatam (1939-42), Masterman was also Secretary of the Education and Public Health departments from 1936 to 1939. From 1943 to 1947, Masterman served as Chief Secretary of Madras. In 1947-48, Masterman served as the United Kingdom's Deputy High Commissioner to India.  Masterman retired from the Indian Civil Service upon India's independence in 1947.

Honours 

Masterman was made a Companion of the Order of the Indian Empire in the 1939 Birthday Honours,  Companion of the Order of the Star of India in the 1944 New Year Honours, and knighted in 1947.

References

1889 births
1982 deaths
Alumni of Trinity College, Oxford
Companions of the Order of the Star of India
Companions of the Order of the Indian Empire
Knights Bachelor